Peter Charles Granata (October 28, 1898 – September 29, 1973) was a U.S. Representative from Illinois.

Born in Chicago, Illinois, Granata attended the public and high schools of his native city.
He graduated from Bryant and Stratton Business College at Chicago in 1912.
He engaged in the coal business in 1917.
Chief clerk to the prosecutor of the city of Chicago 1926-1928 and chief deputy coroner 1928-1930.

Granata was elected to the U.S. House of Representatives in 1930.
Presented credentials as a Republican Member-elect to the Seventy-second Congress and served from March 3, 1931, to April 5, 1932, when he was succeeded by Stanley H. Kunz, who successfully contested the election. Granata had originally won the race by more than 1,000 votes, but Kunz successfully argued that, either by fraud or mistake, he was denied the votes of thousands of "straight ticket" ballots. Congress reviewed the ballots and found that he'd been denied more than 2,300 votes and they declared him the winner. Granata ran again in 1932 and lost.

Granata did continue in politics serving as member a of the Illinois House of Representatives from 1933-1973 and as assistant director of finance of the State of Illinois 1941-1943.

He engaged in the coal and oil business in Chicago until May 1933 and served as vice president of a glass company in Chicago, Illinois in 1948.

He was a resident of Chicago, Illinois, until his death there on September 29, 1973 and was interred in Mount Carmel Cemetery.

References

1898 births
1973 deaths
Republican Party members of the United States House of Representatives from Illinois
Republican Party members of the Illinois House of Representatives
Businesspeople from Chicago
Politicians from Chicago
Bryant and Stratton College alumni
20th-century American politicians
20th-century American businesspeople
Members of the United States House of Representatives removed by contest